The 2019–20 Scottish Junior Cup was the 134th season of the Scottish Junior Cup, the national knockout tournament for member clubs of the Scottish Junior Football Association (SJFA). The competition was sponsored by Macron in the second year of a three-year deal and was known as the Macron Scottish Junior Cup.

A total of 132 clubs entered the competition, which was three more than the previous season despite two teams leaving for the East of Scotland League. This was due to the return of Cruden Bay and Johnstone Burgh plus Bo'ness United Junior, Linlithgow Rose Community, Sauchie Juniors Community, and Syngenta joining the East Region.

Auchinleck Talbot were the defending champions.

On 13 March 2020, the competition was indefinitely suspended at the semi-final stage due to the COVID-19 pandemic. Almost a year later and with no further matches played in the tournament, the competition was officially cancelled on 5 March 2021.

Calendar
The dates for each round of the 2019–20 tournament is as follows:

Drawn matches are replayed and replays that end in a draw proceed direct to a penalty shootout, there is no extra time. Semi-finals are played home and away over two legs with the winner on aggregate progressing to the final. If the aggregate score is tied at the end of the second leg, the match will also proceed direct to a penalty shootout.

First round

Draw
The four Junior clubs competing in the Scottish Cup were not included in the draw for the first round:
 Auchinleck Talbot - Junior Cup holders and West Region Premiership champions
Lochee United - East Superleague champions

Also qualified automatically for the second round were Banks O'Dee, who achieved SFA club licensing requirements, and Girvan, who qualify automatically as historic full members of the Scottish Football Association.

The first and second round draws took place at Hampden Park, Glasgow on 13 August 2019.

Matches

Second round

Notes

Replays

Third round

Replays

Fourth round

Replays

Fifth round

Replay

Quarter-finals

Replay

Semi-finals
The semi-finals were originally scheduled to be held on 28 March and 4 April 2020. The draw made on 17 March 2020. However no further matches were played and the competition was cancelled on 5 March 2021.

First leg

Second leg

Final
The Scottish Junior Cup final was cancelled for the first time since the 1918 tournament.

References

2019–20 in Scottish football cups
Scottish Junior Cup seasons
Scottish Junior Cup